The Tapoli or Tapori were an ancient Celtic tribe of Lusitania, akin to the Lusitanians, to whom they were a dependent tribe, living just north of the river Tagus, around the border area of modern-day Portugal and Spain.

See also
Pre-Roman peoples of the Iberian Peninsula

External links
Detailed map of the Pre-Roman Peoples of Iberia (around 200 BC)

Tribes of Lusitania
Ancient peoples of Portugal